Queullacocha (possibly from Quechua qillwa, qiwlla, qiwiña gull, qucha lake, "gull lake") is a mountain in the Vilcanota mountain range in the Andes of Peru, about  high. It is located in the Cusco Region, Quispicanchi Province, Ocongate District. Queullacocha lies northwest of the mountain Ausangate.

References

Mountains of Peru
Mountains of Cusco Region